Ali Mohammadi (born February 7, 1984) is an amateur Iranian Greco-Roman wrestler. He won the bronze medal for the men's welterweight category at the 2007 Asian Wrestling Championships in Bishkek, Kyrgyzstan.

Mohammadi represented Iran at the 2008 Summer Olympics in Beijing, where he competed for the 66 kg class in men's Greco-Roman wrestling. He lost the second preliminary match to Belarus' Mikhail Siamionau, with a classification score of 1–3.

References

External links
 
 NBC Olympics Profile

1984 births
Living people
Olympic wrestlers of Iran
Wrestlers at the 2008 Summer Olympics
Iranian male sport wrestlers
Asian Wrestling Championships medalists
People from Karaj
21st-century Iranian people